Best: First Things (stylized as Best ~first things~) is the first compilation album released by Japanese pop singer Koda Kumi. It debuted at No. 1 on Oricon, giving her first number-one album, and became her longest charting album, staying on the charts for 124 weeks. The album included all of her a-sides released since her debut in 2000 with Take Back and became one of her highest selling albums, selling nearly two million copies as of 2007.

To help promote the album, Kumi held a special event at Shibuya Station, where fans would replicate the dress she wore on the album's cover. Winners received either a signed copy of the album, or Kumi's first concert DVD, Secret First Class Limited Live.

The album was released in both 2CD and 2CD+DVD, each with different cover art. Limited editions contained the bonus track, "The Meaning of Peace", which was previously released on Kumi's single love across the ocean. Unlike the version released for the Song Nation project Kumi performed with Korean singer-songwriter BoA, this version was not a ballad and, instead, was a dance pop track.

Upon its release, the album received generally positive reviews from both critics and fans, with many praising Kumi's vocals and maturity as her music career progressed.

Information
Best ~first things~ is Japanese singer-songwriter Koda Kumi's first compilation album and contained all of her singles from Take Back (2000) to Promise/Star (2005). The three singles leading up to the album's release were Butterfly, flower and the aforementioned Promise/Star. The album did contain one new track: the first track "No Tricks" (styled as NO TRICKS), which received a remix seven years later on her 2012 album Beach Mix.

Best ~first things~ became Kumi's first album to chart at No. 1 on the Oricon Albums Charts, and was her longest charting album, remaining on the charts for 124 weeks – over two years. The album also became one of her highest selling albums, having sold nearly two million copies as reported in 2007.

The album was released in 2CD and 2CD+DVD with the limited editions of both versions containing the bonus track "The Meaning of Peace" from the Song Nation project on the second CD and a "special video mix" on the DVD. However, this version of "the meaning of peace" is Koda Kumi's "solo version," which had been released on her single Love Across the Ocean. The first press of the 2CD+DVD came with a slipcover and a deluxe booklet.

It is speculated that it was the release and promotions of Best ~first things~ that had saved her career. Not only had the album sold nearly two million copies and become her first No. 1 album on Oricon, but it also secured the number one spot for the Best Selling Female Album in 2005.

Packaging
Best ~first things~ was released in three editions:

2CD: contains twenty-two musical tracks.
2CD+DVD: contains twenty-two musical tracks and eighteen music videos.
2CD+DVD [Special Edition]: contains twenty-three musical tracks, eighteen music videos and a special booklet.

Limited editions of all versions came with the bonus track on the second CD, Koda Kumi's solo version of The Meaning of Peace, and the bonus video "Special Mix Video from "Best ~first Things~"." The "special edition" came with a deluxe booklet, alongside the lyrical booklet.

Background and composition
While most of tracks were from prior singles, the album did contain the new track "No Tricks", which was created exclusively for the album. The track was written and produced by Daisuke "D.I" Imai, who had previously worked with Kumi for several songs on her 2004 studio album, Feel My Mind. Daisuke has worked with several famous artists, including South Korean artists BoA and TVXQ, and Japanese artists Satomi, Ayumi Hamasaki, Lead and Tomomi Itano, among others.

Both "Take Back" and "Trust Your Love" were written by Kumi and composed by Kazuhito Kikuchi, with production by Max Matsuura. The sound and arrangement for both songs were handled by h-wonder, while Koji Morimoto also worked on "Trust Your Love". "Color Of Soul" was written by famous musical composer Miki Watanabe, who has worked with the likes of SMAP, V6, AAA and Yellow Generation. The music for the track was performed by h-wonder, who would continue to work with Kumi well into her later years, even performing the music for Kumi's cover of Linda Yamamoto's song "Dou ni mo Tomaranai" on her 2013 cover album Color the Cover. The lyrics to "Color Of Soul" were written by lyricist Natsumi Watanabe, who had worked on the lyrics for some of the music in the Pretty Soldier Sailor Moon anime series throughout the 1990s. "So Into You" was written and composed by Japanese songwriter Yasuhiro Abe, with the lyrics written by Kumi herself.

"Love Across the Ocean" was written and composed by musical arranger TSUKASA. The track was performed by h-wonder, with the lyrics written by Kumi. "m•a•z•e" became Kumi's first a-side that she had not written the lyrics for. The song was a collaborative effort between musical arrangers 813 and Hiro Yamaguchi, with the piece performed by h-wonder. Kenn Kato, however, wrote the lyrics, which alluded to the themes of the Japanese drama Psycho Doctor, of which the song was the theme song.

Both the songs "real Emotion" and "1000 no Kotoba" were placed on the album, despite only "real Emotion" being an official A-side. "real Emotion" was written by Kenn Kato, with the arrangement by Kazuhiro Hara and performance by h-wonder. "1000 no Kotoba" was arranged by Takahito Eguchi and Noriko Matsueda, the latter of which had arranged much of the music for Final Fantasy X-2. Kazushige Nojima, however, wrote the lyrics for the piece. "Come With Me" was arranged and composed by h-wonder, with Kumi writing the lyrical portion. "Gentle Words" was composed by Do As Infinity's guitarist Dai Nagao (D.A.I), with h-wonder performing the track. "Crazy 4 U" was written, arranged and performed by Miki Watanabe.

Koda Kumi's solo version of "The Meaning of Peace" was placed on the album as a bonus track. While Tetsuya Komuro wrote, arranged and performed the original piece performed as a duet between Kumi and BoA, h-wonder performed the instrumental for Kumi's solo version.

Promotion

To help promote her album, on September 21, 2005, Koda Kumi held a special costume exhibition in Shibuya at Shibuya Station and an event where fans would try their best to replicate the dress Kumi wore on the cover of the album. During the event, fans were able enter a lottery for a chance to win a signed copy of Best ~first things~ or her first concert DVD Secret ~First Class Limited Live~.

Background narration
"I’m glad I didn’t give up . . . I could finally see a stage sparkling in the spotlight. . . Every single day felt like a dream." – Koda Kumi

Koda Kumi talks in KODA REKI how 2005 became her happiest year, where her songs continued to top the charts and she was invited to music shows. She says her happiest moments were when she knew people were listening to her songs. By being invited to the Japan Record Awards and Kōhaku Uta Gassen, being given several awards and performing on prestigious shows, she felt as though she was final able to repay the people who had been supporting her; namely, her parents.

2005 also gave boom to her ero-kawaii style and popularity. She said that, while she was proud to have the title, she was nervous of what her parents would think.

"When I saw my parents smiling happily, it was then, from the bottom of my heart, I was glad I stuck with my style." – Koda Kumi

Track listing

Charts
Oricon Sales Chart (Japan)

Alternate versions
NO TRICKS: Found on the album (2005)
NO TRICKS [Shohei Matsumoto & Junichi Matsuda Remix]: Found on Beach Mix (2012)

References

Koda Kumi albums
2005 greatest hits albums
2005 video albums
Music video compilation albums
Avex Group compilation albums
Avex Group video albums